Lucía Gil Santiago (born 29 May 1998 in Madrid) is a Spanish singer and actress, best known for winning the first season of the Spanish version of the Disney Channel singing competition My Camp Rock. She has also starred in several TV series, including Gran Reserva and La Gira.

Biography 
Although Lucía Gil first rose to fame when she won the first season of the Spanish version of My Camp Rock in 2009, by that time she had already participated in the TV singing competition Veo Veo at the age of seven and had uploaded multiple videos of cover songs on YouTube. In 2009, at the age of 10, she entered the competition My Camp Rock produced by Disney Channel Spain. She advanced to the semifinals and then the finals. Having received the most votes on the Disney Channel Spain website, she became the winner.

Also in 2009, Gil was called by RTVE to play the part of the daughter of one of the two protagonist families in the TV series Gran Reserva. It was premiered on La 1 in 2010 and gained Lucía more fame, but her character was killed in an accident at the end of the first season. Presently, she acts in two TV series, La Gira, produced by Disney Channel Spain, and Violetta, produced by Disney Channel Latin America. For La Gira ("The Tour"), which is about musicians and in which Lucía plays one of the main characters, the singer of the band Pop4U, she recorded several songs.

As of May 2013, Gil is filming a TV series called The Avatars. The series is in English, with American actors, and is aimed at the international market. It is produced by the Spanish company Portocabo and is being filmed in Spain. There is already a preliminary agreement to broadcast it in Italia on Rai Kids and in Germany. Lucía is playing Carmen, a videoblogger and fan of a band called The Avatar. Carmen will come to USA to meet her favourite band and will join the fight against other girls for the heart of the main guy protagonist.

Fan following 
Fans of Lucía Gil call themselves lugilators.

Filmography

Television

Discography

Albums

Soundtracks (with the band Pop4U)

Canciones

Awards and nominations

References

External links 
 
 
 

1998 births
Living people
Spanish television actresses
Actresses from Madrid
Spanish child actresses
21st-century Spanish singers
21st-century Spanish women singers
Walt Disney Records artists